North Cray is a rural settlement in South East London, England, within the London Borough of Bexley.

History

Early history 
North Cray was previously a civil parish in the Hundred of Ruxley, Sutton-at-Hone Lathe. The settlement Ruxley had its own parish but it was abolished in 1557 and the area was absorbed into North Cray parish.

Modern history 

North Cray was within Kent until the creation of Greater London in 1965. From 1894 to 1934 North Cray was within the Bromley Rural District, then it was in the Chislehurst and Sidcup Urban District from 1934 to 1965; then finally the London Borough of Bexley from 1965 which remains today.

Transport

Buses
492 to Bluewater via Bexley, Bexleyheath, Crayford, Dartford, Stone & Greenhithe or to Sidcup via Ruxley & Foots Cray. Operated by Arriva London for London Buses.

Rail
The nearest National Rail station to North Cray is Bexley.

Notable people 
North Cray briefly became the centre of international attention in August 1822 when Robert Stewart, Viscount Castlereagh, the Foreign Secretary, committed suicide at his country home Loring Hall.

Other notable people associated with the area include geologist Joshua Trimmer, colonial administrator Harry Ord, and cricketer John Gosling, all of whom were born in North Cray.

Neighbouring areas

References

Districts of the London Borough of Bexley
Sidcup
Areas of London
Former civil parishes in the London Borough of Bromley
Former civil parishes in the London Borough of Bexley
Villages in London